Clarence Elder was a British art director. During the 1930s he worked for British International Pictures. In 1947 he directed his only film Silver Darlings.

Selected filmography
 The Way of Lost Souls (1929)
 The Yellow Mask (1930)
 The Flame of Love (1930)
 The Flying Fool (1931)
 Fascination (1931)
 Potiphar's Wife (1931)
 The Maid of the Mountains (1932)
 The Indiscretions of Eve (1932)
 Abdul the Damned (1935)
 Invitation to the Waltz (1935)
 I Give My Heart (1935)
 The Student's Romance (1935)
 Music Hath Charms (1935)
 Heart's Desire (1936)
 The Silver Darlings (1947)

References

Bibliography
 Bergfelder, Tim & Cargnelli, Christian. Destination London: German-speaking emigrés and British cinema, 1925-1950. Berghahn Books, 2008.

External links

Year of birth unknown
Year of death unknown
British film directors
British screenwriters
British art directors